In geometry, the truncated order-3 apeirogonal tiling is a uniform tiling of the hyperbolic plane with a Schläfli symbol of t{∞,3}.

Dual tiling
The dual tiling, the infinite-order triakis triangular tiling, has face configuration V3.∞.∞.

Related polyhedra and tiling 

This hyperbolic tiling is topologically related as a part of sequence of uniform truncated polyhedra with vertex configurations (3.2n.2n), and [n,3] Coxeter group symmetry.

See also

List of uniform planar tilings
Tilings of regular polygons
Uniform tilings in hyperbolic plane

References

 John H. Conway, Heidi Burgiel, Chaim Goodman-Strass, The Symmetries of Things 2008,  (Chapter 19, The Hyperbolic Archimedean Tessellations)

External links 

Apeirogonal tilings
Hyperbolic tilings
Isogonal tilings
Order-3 tilings
Truncated tilings
Uniform tilings